
The Bassa people are a West African ethnic group primarily native to Liberia. The Bassa people are a subgroup of the larger Kru people of Liberia and Ivory Coast. They form a majority or a significant minority in Liberia's Grand Bassa, Rivercess, Margibi and Montserrado counties. In Liberia's capital of Monrovia, they are the largest ethnic group. With an overall population of about 1.05 million, they are the second largest ethnic group in Liberia (18%), after the Kpelle people (26%). Small Bassa communities are also found in Sierra Leone and Ivory Coast.

The Bassa speak the Bassa language, a Kru language that belongs to the Niger-Congo family of languages. They had their own pictographic writing system but it went out of use in the 19th century, was rediscovered among the slaves of Brazil and the West Indies in 1890s, and reconstructed in early 1900 by Thomas Flo Darvin Lewis. The revived signs-based script is called Ehni Ka Se Fa.

In local languages, the Bassa people are also known as Gboboh, Adbassa or Bambog-Mbog people.

History
The Bassa people are from Western Sudan and later migrated to and lived in coastal West Africa and other parts including Liberia, Sierra Leone, Togo and Nigeria, Senegal while others settled in central African region of Cameroon and Congo. Geographically separated groups evolved their separate culture, language and society. The Bassa people are related to the Basari people of Togo and Senegal, the Bassa-Mpoku people in Congo regions, the Bassa people of Cameroon.

The Bassa people were located around the coastal regions for centuries before being displaced by the Duala.

The linguistic evidence and oral traditions of these geographically diverse, small yet significant group suggests that their name Bassa may be related to Bassa Sooh Nyombe which means "Father Stone's people". Early European traders had trouble pronouncing the entire phrase, and the shorter form Bassa has been used in Western literature ever since.

Religion
The traditional religion of the Bassa people has a moral and ethical foundation, one that reveres ancestors and supernatural spirits. Christianity arrived among the Bassa people during the colonial era, and the first Bible was translated into Bassa language in 1922. The adoption process fused the idea of Christian God with their traditional idea of a Supreme Being and powerful first ancestor who is merciful and revengeful, rewarding the good and punishing the bad. The traditional religion has included secret rites of passage for men and women, such as the Sande society.

Numerous missionaries from different denominations of Christianity have been active among the Bassa people during the 20th century. These has led to many Bassa independent churches from Europe, North America, Africa and Evangelical movements. In contemporary times, the Bassa people predominantly practice Christianity, but they have retained elements of their traditional religion.

Society
The Bassa people are traditionally settled farmers who grow yam, cassava, eddoes and plantain. They are a lineage-linked independent clans who live in villages, each with a chief.

The Bassa people are among those that practice the woman initiation society called Sande. (Also referred to as Bondo)

References

Sources
Gordon, Raymond G., Jr. (ed.), 2005. Ethnologue: Languages of the World, Fifteenth edition. Dallas, Tex.: SIL International. Online version.
Somah, Syrulwa (2003), Nyanyan Gohn-Manan History, Migration and Government of the Bassa; Lightning Source Inc.

External links
For spirits and kings: African art from the Paul and Ruth Tishman collection,  The Metropolitan Museum of Art Libraries, contains material on the Bassa people

 
Ethnic groups in Liberia